Minister of Social Security or Minister for Social Security may refer to:
 The Minister of Social Security in the Government of the United Kingdom, 1966–1968: Secretary of State for Work and Pensions#Minister_of_Social_Security
 Minister of State for Social Security in the Government of the United Kingdom: see Secretary of State for Work and Pensions
 Minister for Social Security (Scotland) (2016-present)
 Minister for Social Security (Sweden)